The Masked Ball is an American play written by Clyde Fitch. It was featured on Broadway in 1892 and starred Maude Adams.

American plays
1892 plays
Broadway plays